Mount Hope is an unincorporated community in eastern Salt Creek Township, Holmes County, Ohio, United States.  It has a post office with the ZIP code 44660.  It lies along State Route 241.

References

Unincorporated communities in Ohio
Unincorporated communities in Holmes County, Ohio